Hubern Evans (born 16 April 1956) is a Guyanese cricketer. He played in nine first-class matches for Guyana from 1976 to 1989.

See also
 List of Guyanese representative cricketers

References

External links
 

1956 births
Living people
Guyanese cricketers
Guyana cricketers